Elections to Weymouth and Portland Borough Council were held on 4 May 2000.  One third of the council was up for election and the council stayed under no overall control.

After the election, the composition of the council was
Labour 13
Liberal Democrat 12
Conservative 5
Independent 5

Election result

References
2000 Weymouth and Portland election result

2000
2000 English local elections
20th century in Dorset